Eduard Valerievich Seleznev (born 1969), known as The Arkhangelsk Cannibal, is a Russian serial killer who murdered three drinking companions in Arkhangelsk, whose bodies he later dismembered and liquified for consumption. Previously convicted of a double murder in 2002, he was found guilty of these new killings and sentenced to life imprisonment in a special regime colony.

Early life
Seleznev was born in Arkhangelsk in 1969. From an early age, he was sent to a boarding school and never got to know his parents. He studied until the 8th grade, and was characterized as slow, uninitiated and a habitual smoker who engaged in thefts. In 1984, he graduated from a vocational school as a bricklayer, working odd jobs to make ends meet, and he lived in a run-down hostel. On several occasions, he was convicted of embezzlement, and after one of his releases in 2000, the now-jobless Seleznev alternated between living in unlocked basements and homeless shelters. In 2002, he was convicted of a double murder and served 13 years in prison before being released in September 2015. He was back to living on the streets, where he survived by killings stray cats and dogs, sometimes birds as well, whose corpses he would eat.

Murders
In March 2016, Seleznev killed his first victim, a fellow homeless man he had met at a homeless shelter with whom he shared a room. He stabbed the man with a knife, then dismembered the remains with an axe, liquifying some of his remains, which he later slurped down, as he had trouble eating hardened foods due to his lack of teeth. As for the rest of the body parts, he packaged them in garbage bags and threw them into the Volokhnitsa River, in the Isagorsk District.

Two years later, in March 2018, Seleznev moved into the apartment of another man, whom he promptly killed and cannibalized in a similar manner to the first one, this time throwing his remains into Lake Butygino in the Mayskaya Gorksa District. He decided to remain in the victim's flat, and began work at a local meat processing plant. At some point, the man's relatives, desperate to get in touch with the missing man, travelled to the apartment, only to find that only Eduard was present. When questioned about his roommate's whereabouts, he replied that the man was alive and well, and had moved to St. Petersburg, where he supposedly had been offered a job concerning "something to do with the forest." Seleznev claimed that their family member had borrowed a backpack and left 35 thousand rubles for the rent, and gone on his merry way. Somewhat skeptical of the story, the family members ordered him to clean the mess that he had caused while living there, but while they were inspecting the fridge, they noticed some odd-looking unpackaged meat lying on one of the rafts. Seleznev noticed this, and explained it away as that being raw fish. Upon further investigation, the father of the missing landlord found a jacket with Seleznev's passport in it, as well as the bank card with the name of man he didn't recognize. As Seleznev had previously claimed to have no personal identification on him, this alarmed the father, who quickly went to the police.

Arrest, trial and imprisonment
After receiving the information about the suspicious findings, authorities went to the apartment and quickly arrested Seleznev. He was brought back to the police station for questioning, and after several interrogations, he readily confessed that he had killed, dismembered and eaten the remains of three drinking companions he had encountered within the last two years. All of them had been stabbed in their sleep and later chopped into pieces with an axe, with some of the remains cannibalized and the others thrown in bodies of water around Arkhangelsk. When asked about his motive, Seleznev claimed that after eating so many animals, he began to develop a craving for human flesh, and additionally claimed that a voice (or voices) had ordered him to kill and consume humans. Due to the severity of his crimes, he was sent for a psychiatric examination, where he was determined to be sane and aware of his actions, in spite of his claims of hearing voices.

Seleznev's trial began on January 13, 2020. From the very beginning, he recanted his confession and demanded a jury trial. Much to his surprise, he was found guilty and sentenced to life imprisonment in a special regime colony, as well as having to pay one million rubles in restitution to the victims' family members.

See also
 List of incidents of cannibalism
 List of Russian serial killers

References

1969 births
21st-century Russian criminals
Living people
Male serial killers
People convicted of embezzlement
People convicted of murder by Russia
People from Arkhangelsk
Prisoners sentenced to life imprisonment by Russia
Russian cannibals
Russian male criminals
Russian people convicted of murder
Russian prisoners sentenced to life imprisonment
Russian serial killers